Evansoseius is a genus of mites in the Phytoseiidae family.

Species
 Evansoseius macfarlanei Sheals, 1962

References

Phytoseiidae